Miss Earth USA (formerly Miss Earth United States) is an annual beauty pageant which selects the United States representative to Miss Earth which is an annual international beauty pageant promoting environmental awareness.

The current titleholder is Danielle Mullins from Kentucky. Mullins was crowned Miss Earth USA 2023 on January 7, 2023 by the Miss Earth USA 2022, Brielle Simons from Connecticut during the competition that was held at the Orange County Convention Center's Linda Chapin Theater in Orlando, Florida.

In January 2016, owners of Miss Earth, Carousel Productions, Inc., announced, through their official Facebook fan page, that the Miss Earth USA program would be managed by U.S. Earth Productions/Beauty Beyond Borders, Inc. under the leadership of national director Laura Clark.

In August 2018, the current organization announced it would be changing its name to Miss Earth USA.

History

2001-2004: Ms. America International
The United States delegates in Miss Earth from 2001–2005 were selected by the Ms. America International pageant where the prize was to represent the United States at the Miss Earth Pageant.

The very first American delegate for Miss Earth is Abigail Royce of California. She competed in 2001 where she landed as one of the Top 10 semifinalists.

2005-2015: Earth Pageant Productions
In 2005, Earth Pageant Productions acquired the rights to conduct the national competition for the United States and to select a national winner to participate in the Miss Earth pageant. Thus, a national pageant was established to conduct the annual Miss Earth United States pageant.

Miss Earth United States represents the United States in the annual Miss Earth pageant. The pageant adopted the slogan "Continuing the Legacy of Beauty and Responsibility". The pageant focused mainly on promoting environmental causes and winners are chosen equally on their physical attributes as well as their understanding and knowledge of the issues affecting the Earth.

In order to bring more awareness to the cause, and to provide the next generation an opportunity to get involved, a teen division was added in 2008. The winner of the pageant, held in conjunction with the Miss Earth United States pageant, was awarded the title of Miss Teen Earth United States. As a result, the pageant became known as the US Earth pageants.

2016-Present: U.S. Earth Productions/Beauty Beyond Borders, Inc. 
The US Earth Productions/Beauty Beyond Borders, Inc. is the organization that currently owns and runs the Miss Earth USA beauty contest since 2016. The organization is based in Washington, D.C.

National Competition 
Pre-pageant events take place over a one-week period and include community service work within the host location.

Delegates are scored in the following areas: judges' interview, evening gown, swimwear, a Think Global, Act Local environmental project, runway, photogenic, media interview, and social media presence and engagement.

State & Regional Competitions 
Every year, states hold a preliminary competition to choose their delegate for the Miss Earth USA pageant. Delegates may be appointed state or regional titles if a state pageant is not offered in their area. The state/regional winners hold the title "Miss (State/Region) Earth USA" for the year of their reign.

State contestants are judged equally in the following categories: community service, gown, interview, photogenic, and swimwear.

The U.S. Earth Productions/Beauty Beyond Borders, Inc. organization awards directorships to pageant directors, who in some cases are responsible for more than one state or a region of the United States.

Currently, the Miss Earth USA organization does allow contestants to re-compete at the national pageant in the same division under the previous state title held, or a regional title, if a state title has already been awarded or appointed.

Performance at Miss Earth
In 2020, Lindsey Coffey is the first U.S. representative to win Miss Earth during their 20th anniversary. Marisa Butler, Miss Earth USA 2021, Emanii Davis, Miss Earth USA 2019, and Andrea Neu, Miss Earth USA 2014, placed first-runner up as Miss Earth - Air in their respective years competing at Miss Earth.

The U.S. placed six consecutive years at Miss Earth between 2012-2017. This the country's longest placement streak since the pageant's inception in 2001.

Results Summary

Placements in Miss Earth
USA holds a record of 13 placements at Miss Earth, third overall behind Philippines, and Venezuela.
 Miss Earth: Lindsey Coffey (2020)
 Miss Earth Air (1st Runner-up): Andrea Neu (2014), Emanii Davis (2019), Marisa Butler (2021)
 Miss Earth Water (2nd Runner-up): Brittany Payne (2015)
 Miss Earth Fire (3rd Runner-up): Corrin Stellakis (2016)
 Top 8: Amanda Kimmel (2005), Siria Bojorquez (2012)
 Top 10: Abigail Royce (2001)
 Top 14/16: Amanda Pennekamp (2006), Jana Murrell (2008), Danielle Bounds (2010), Nicolle Velez (2013), Andrea Gibau (2017)

Editions
The following is a list of all Miss Earth USA winners and elemental court during their year of crowning.

Miss Earth USA representatives to the Miss Earth pageant 
This is a list of women who have represented United States at the Miss Earth pageant:

Color key

Notes:
  † Now deceased

By number of states

Winners' gallery

Additional Miss Earth USA Divisions 
The current Miss Earth USA program requires contestants be ages 18–28 as of January 1 of the competition year. U.S. Earth Productions/Beauty Beyond Borders, Inc. offers three additional divisions supporting Miss Earth USA. The winners of the additional divisions for ages 14–18 (Teen) and 21-59 (Mrs.) go on to compete at international competitions. Previously the program had an Elite Miss division for ages 26–38, but it was discontinued in 2022. All delegates are never married (excluding Mrs.), never had children (excluding Mrs.), natural born female, and U.S. citizens. Together, these delegates make up Miss Earth USA system and bring awareness to environmental concerns while celebrating talents in modeling, fashion, and public speaking.

Titleholders

The following is a list of all Miss Earth USA supporting division titleholders.

Notes:

2022: Presley Patrick previously represented Pennsylvania at Teen Miss Earth USA 2021, placing 2nd runner-up.
 2022: Christine Rich previously represented Maryland at Mrs. USA Earth 2021 and 2019, placing 2nd and 3rd runner-up and Delaware at Mrs. USA Earth 2018, placing 1st runner-up. Christine was previously Mrs. Delaware America 2013, Mrs. Delaware United States 2015, placing top 15 at Mrs. United States, and Mrs. Delaware Galaxy 2018, placing 2nd runner-up at Mrs. Galaxy International.
2019: Celine Pelofi was previously Ms. United States 2015 representing Florida.
 2018: Brandi Jarvis Ibos previously represented Mississippi at Miss Earth United States 2016, placing Top 10.
 2018: Payton Stockman previously represented Florida at Teen Miss Earth United States 2017, placing 1st Runner-Up and earned the swim award.
 2015: Alyssa Klinzing was previously Miss Kansas Teen USA 2013, placing Top 16 at Miss Teen USA 2013 and later Miss Kansas USA 2019, placing Top 10 at Miss USA 2019.
 2015: Vincenza Carrieri-Russo was previously Miss Delaware USA 2008 and Miss Delaware United States 2014, placing 2nd-Runner Up at Miss United States 2014.

References

External links
 Official website
 Beauties for a Cause USA - Official nonprofit foundation helping to support the work of Miss Earth USA.

 
2005 establishments in the United States
Beauty pageants in the United States